Phillip Sontag (September 26, 1878 – June 20, 1917) was an American gymnast. He competed in four events at the 1904 Summer Olympics.

References

Further reading
 
 

1878 births
1917 deaths
American male artistic gymnasts
Olympic gymnasts of the United States
Gymnasts at the 1904 Summer Olympics
Sportspeople from Davenport, Iowa